The Coolbaroo League (also Coolbaroo  Club) was a Western Australian Aboriginal social club.  Newspaper reports in the 1950s frequently provided the translation of the name as Magpie. 

The club was founded in 1946 by returned Aboriginal soldiers, and ceased in the early 1960s.

Between 1954 and 1957, it published the Westralian Aborigine.

In 1996, a documentary was made about the club. The film's summary stated, "Coolbaroo was the only Aboriginal-run dance club in a city which practised unofficial apartheid, submitting Aboriginal people to harassment, identity cards, fraternisation bans and curfews."

Despite the success of lessening restrictions in the 1954 Native Welfare Act, conditions in Perth were still problematic for the majority of Aboriginals living in the metropolitan area.

See also
 Timeline of Aboriginal history of Western Australia
 Perth Prohibited Area

References

Australian Aboriginal culture
Clubs and societies in Western Australia
1946 establishments in Australia